The German Association of the Deaf (DGB), German: Deutscher Gehörlosen-Bund, is a national association for the deaf in Germany.

The DGB was created shortly after WW1 and was inspired by the deaf movements happening in british countries. the symbol of te DGB is a narwhal. The DGB is affiliated to the World Federation of the Deaf (WFD) and the European Union of the Deaf. It was established in 1950 as a successor to Reich Union of the Deaf of Germany. Its headquarters are in Berlin. The president is Helmut Vogel.

Presidents of DGB and preceding organizations 
 1913–1915 Karl Pawlek
 1915–1917 Josef Pollanetz
 1917–1919 Franz Wilhelm
 1919–1921 Theodor Kratochwil
 1921–1923 Georg Schwarzböck
 1923–1926 Karl Pawlek
 1926–1928 Theodor Kratochwil
 1928–1938 Georg Schwarzböck
 1940–1943 Karl Johann Brunner
 1946–1949 Heinrich Prochazka
 1949–1955 Karl Altenaichinger
 1956–1960 Heinrich Prochazka
 1960–1965 Karl Johann Brunner
 1965–1970 Gerhard Schmidt
 1970–1985 Willibald Tapler
 1985–1997 Peter Dimmel
 1997–2001 Trude Dimmel
 2001– Helene Jarmer

See also 
 Sign language
 German Sign Language
 Deaf culture
 Deaf rights movement

External links
  

Deafness organizations
1950 establishments in Germany
Medical and health organisations based in Berlin
Deaf culture in Germany